Daily Khabrain is a Pakistani daily newspaper. It is one of Pakistan's most widely circulated Urdu-language newspapers. The Daily Khabrain is published by the Khabrain Group of Newspapers. It is published simultaneously from Islamabad, Karachi, Lahore, Peshawar, Multan, Hyderabad, Muzaffarabad South Punjab Bahawalpur and Sukkur.

It is a member publication of All Pakistan Newspapers Society organization.

History
It was founded by Zia Shahid in 1992.

Khabrain Group
Khabrain Group owns the following publications and television station:
 Daily Khabroon, a Punjabi language newspaper
 Daily Khabraan, a Sindhi language newspaper
 Daily The Post
 Sahafat, defunct newspaper
 Channel 5, founded in 2012

Ownership
 Zia Shahid family (63.9 percent)
 Aleem Chaudhry (8.2 percent)
 Muzzafar Un Nisa (2.7 percent)

Notable columnist
Humayon Dar - a specialist in Islamic banking and finance

References

External links
 

Daily newspapers published in Pakistan
Publications established in 1992
Urdu-language newspapers published in Pakistan
Mass media in Pakistan